John Taylor (born 25 June 1949, Birmingham) is an English former professional footballer who played as a goalkeeper. He played in The Football League for three clubs during the 1970s.

Playing career
Taylor began his professional career with Chester, who he joined from Pwllheli in July 1970, in a summer that also saw fellow youngsters Alan Groves, Dave Kennedy and Brian Woodall and the experienced Dave Pountney arrive at the Fourth Division club. Although he made his debut for Chester against Peterborough United on 31 October 1970, Taylor managed just seven league appearances in his first two seasons at the club as he acted as reserve to Terry Carling and then Gordon Livsey.

He finally established himself at the club during the 1972–73 season, as he recovered from a pre–season injury to play in the final 40 league games of the season. He played in the opening 18 games of the following season, but the signing of Grenville Millington led to Taylor losing his place and he managed just five more league starts. In the 1974–75 season (when Chester won promotion from the Football League Fourth Division and reached the semi–finals of the Football League Cup), Taylor was restricted to a solitary Welsh Cup outing against Oswestry Town as he brought his Chester career to a close. During the season, he had a short loan stint with Rochdale, where he played three games.

After a spell with non-league side Bangor City, Taylor returned to The Football League with Stockport County in November 1975. Just one league appearance was added to his career tally and he joined Worcester City.

References

1949 births
Living people
Footballers from Birmingham, West Midlands
English footballers
English Football League players
Association football goalkeepers
Chester City F.C. players
Rochdale A.F.C. players
Bangor City F.C. players
Stockport County F.C. players
Worcester City F.C. players
Pwllheli F.C. players